Eslamabad-e Chah-e Manj (also Romanized as Eslāmābād-e Chāh-e Manj; also known as Eslāmābād) is a village in Chahak Rural District, in the Central District of Khatam County, Yazd Province, Iran. At the 2006 census, its population was 179, in 43 families.

References 

Populated places in Khatam County